Brigitte Shim, FRAIC, OC, RCA, Hon. FAIA, OAA (December 8, 1958) is a Canadian architect known for her small house designs in Canada and other works in architecture of different scales. Shim is a founding partner of Shim-Sutcliffe Architects, along with her husband, Howard Sutcliffe. Before the establishment of Shim-Sutcliffe Architects in 1994, she was a practicing architect who also taught at the University of Toronto's John H. Daniels Faculty of Architecture, Landscape and Design. She continues to guide young designers as a tenured professor at University of Toronto and as a visiting professor to many other institutions until today. Her works span different scales in architecture, ranging from chairs to public facilities. Her work often shows an interest in the relationship between architecture and nature. Her work has garnered awards such as over a dozen Governor General’s Medals for architecture. Shim is an invested officer of The Order of Canada for her significant contributions to the country.

History

Education and early career 
Immigrating to Canada in 1965, Shim worked collaboratively with her husband, Howard Sutcliffe, since the beginning of her career. The couple met at the University of Waterloo, where they both obtained a Bachelor of Environmental Studies in 1981 and a Bachelor of Architecture in 1983. Concurrently in 1981, Shim began an apprenticeship under Arthur Erickson Architects, an acclaimed designer in Vancouver. She moved to Toronto to join Baird / Sampson Architects from 1983 to 1987, and concurrently started teaching at the University of Toronto's John H. Daniels Faculty of Architecture in 1988. During her professorship, she designed several pieces of furniture with Howard Sutcliffe; she described this collaboration as her “way to explore ideas and source materials.” In 1989, Shim married Sutcliffe and the couple started to expand their portfolio.

Career 
Some of Shim's and her husband's, Howard Sutcliffe's, earliest collaborations include an architectural garden in Don Mills in 1989, a remote lakefront house in Haliburton, Ontario in 1991 and their own house in 1993. All three projects won awards from the Royal Architectural Institute of Canada and the two residential projects also won awards from the Canada Wood Council. A milestone for the establishment of Shim-Sutcliffe in 1994 was the couple's own house. A small residential project on a laneway property in Toronto, it is rich in detail and has been described as a built manifesto for their work. Shim and her husband both share an appreciation towards landscape, and an admiration for craft and culture. They draw inspiration from architects such as Carlo Scarpa, Alvar Aalto, and the De Stijl Group, as well as from traditional Japanese architecture. They have said that Charles and Ray Eames are role models for their joy during the design process. Shim explains that they “look like they have a lot of fun. A lot of people do good design, but don’t have a life.”
 
From 1997 to 2002, Shim-Sutcliffe designed some of the most recognized projects in Ontario: Craven Road House in Toronto (1997), Ledbury Park in Toronto (1999), the dining hall for Moorelands Camp at Lake Kawagama (2002), and a boathouse on Lake Muskoka (2004). In the following years, Shim and her firm continued to expand their portfolio to include further institutional, gallery and religious buildings. These projects include a library and chapel at Massey College (2006), the Corkin Gallery (2010), the Frum Collection of African Art at the Art Gallery of Ontario (2008) and the Bet Ha'am Synagogue in Portland, Maine (2008). One of the firm's most notable buildings, the Integral House in Toronto was designed in 2009.

Professorship 
Shim joined the University of Toronto's John H. Daniels Faculty of Architecture in 1988. Currently, she is a tenured professor at the University of Toronto. Shim is also a visiting lecturer at institutions including Harvard and Yale. Her courses are associated with her practice and expertise, including core design studios, advanced design studios, and History and Theory of Landscape Architecture.

 Visiting Critics Studio at Carleton University of Architecture (1990)
 Visiting Professor for the Thesis Program at McGill University School of Architecture (1992)
 Visiting professorship at Harvard University Graduate School of Design (1996 and 1993)
 Henry Bishop Visiting Chair (2001)
 Visiting Bicentennial Professor in Canadian Studies (2001) at Yale School of Architecture
 Held the invited international visiting professorship at École Polytechnique Fédérale de Lausanne (2002)
 2014, 2010, and 2005 Eero Saarinen Visiting Professor at Yale School of Architecture
 Martell Distinguished Visiting Critic at the University at Buffaloof Architecture and Planning (2006)
 Martell Distinguished Visiting Critic at the University of Buffalo’s School of Architecture and Planning (2006)
 Shim was the William B. and Charlotte Shepherd Davenport Visiting Professor (2008)
 Somerville Visiting Lecturer at the University of Calgary's Faculty of Environmental Design (2013)
 Portman Visiting Critic at Georgia Institute of Technology College of Design (2016)

Design philosophy and style 
Shim highly values the interlocking of architecture and nature. She is known to heighten the importance of landscape in architectural design and tries to ensure that the architecture fits within its context. Her interest in nature especially shows in her use of water. She has described how water extends our experience of a public space, garden or house.

Shim has asserted that small-scale houses are a preferred typology to work with when being experimental. Her works are known to be modest in output, but with high levels of creativity and functionality. As one critic, Kelvin Browne wrote: “Their work is poised between what I think of as art — beautiful, pure sculptural moments — and spaces that smartly respond to functional imperatives.”

Her pursuit for the high level of completeness in details derives from her interests in interrelated scales of architecture. Shim and Sutcliffe have been collaborating on furniture designs since the beginning of their career. Their designs have been produced by the furnishing company, Nienkamper. In her office, she prefers to stay small in staff and projects in order to work out every detail of the project. Currently, Shim-Sutcliffe Architects is composed of just over 10 architects. Shim and her colleagues annually design one or two projects, to establish a deep and mutual connection with the client. She says of the studio's work style: “We’re pretty efficient. We can crank out more work in a short time than a lot of larger outfits.”

Notable projects

Laneway House (Toronto, 1993) 
Laneway House is one of the earliest works that demonstrates Shim's experimental mindset in her architectural career. Shim and Howard are the client and the architect themselves, entirely designing for what they appreciate in a dwelling. The fundamental question that started this project was, “can a laneway housing work in Toronto?” The concept derived from the rapid and messy advancements in Toronto from 1870 to 1930. The deficiency and unordered developments led to establishments in laneways. However, the problems arise from the essences in dwelling. A laneway house's issues with privacy, noise and smells suggest many potential ruins to the quality of life.

Shim and Howard initiated the project by buying a junker lot, near Queen and Leslie, shoved with abandoned cars. Consequently, three more lots were purchased to stitch them into a regular sized lot. The approval process required many devotes as the City of Toronto refused the permission. However, the proposal was taken to the Ontario Municipal Board, which allowed the progression of the concept, ‘laneway suites’ in Toronto.

The inexpensive apartment on top of a garage has a modest appearance. Arranged with concrete walls, the living contains two bedrooms, one bathroom and a small office on the second floor. The stacked volumes are pierced by the naturally lit staircase that is aligned with a shining Venetian plastered wall. All the studies that accompanied the Laneway Housing designs are thoughtfully documented to ‘Site Unseen’ by Shim and Donald Chong, her colleague, in 2003.

Moorelands Camp Dining Hall (Dorset, 2000) 
Moorelands Camp Dining Hall is one of Shim’s works that best showcases her appreciation towards nature. Only accessible by boat, the project sits in the middle of Northern Ontario, surrounded by rocky peninsulas, pine forests and lakes. Its functionality is to provide a camp with wilderness experience for children who are underprivileged due to financial constraints.

The Dining Hall takes the form of a barn and tries to blur the boundary between outside and inside. The combination of twelve glulam trusses, small dimension lumbers, and light steel elements compose a wooden tent-like structure. At its center, the motorized greenhouse glazing system shines natural light along the roof ridge and floods the space, creating a spiritual impression. All these merge to create mindful fabrication details that Shim always pursues. A jury from Governor General’s Medals in Architecture describes Moorelands Camp Dining Hall as “a modest project that exhibits a very strong spatial and tectonic idea.”

Integral House (Toronto, 2009) 
The project demonstrates the connection with the client that Shim strongly values as an architect. Having a multi-faceted client, Dr. James Stewart, was the biggest factor in creating a unique residence that can host intimate or public musical concerts. He is an acclaimed mathematician, a philanthropist, and a professional violinist. His affection towards curves are transferred to provide both the start and the end point of the design.

Integral House is a private residence, situated in the middle of Toronto’s Rosedale Ravine. It is a collective facility that includes a residence of five floors with four bedrooms, eight bathrooms and a concert hall that can host over 150 people. The Integral House tries to create a smooth transition from the bottom of the ravine slope to the top of tree bushes. From its exterior, the Integral House reads as two volumes, a wooden base on the ground, and a translucent glass volume that floats on top. The wooden base is solidly cladded with oak, dissolving into oak fins and curved glass above. The sun shading and acoustically isolating vertical fins gently forms the perimeter of the house, resonating the undulation throughout the river valley. The materiality throughout the building demonstrates Shim’s attempt to connect with nature. The inside features sensuous details such as the hand blown laminated glass staircase, which is a collaborated artwork with a glass artist, Mimi Gellman. As the cast bronze clips and stainless steel cables support the staircase, it tries to resemble warmth in nature. The project not only pursues natural beauty but also sustainability. Geothermal pipes are buried below the driveway for heating and cooling of all programs and the green roof above adds to the effect by reducing the heat island effect.

Other notable projects 
 Garden Pavilion and Reflecting Pool (Don Mills, 1992)
 Muskoka Boathouse (Lake Muskoka, 1999) 
 Weathering Steel House (Toronto, 2001)
 Corkin Gallery (Toronto, 2004)
 Craven Road Studio (Toronto, 2006)
 House on the Ravine Edge (Toronto, 2011)

Awards 
All of the projects to date honored Shim many renowned awards such as fourteen Governor General’s Medals for architecture, Wood Design Honor Awards, and American Institute of Architects National Honor Awards. Currently, Shim is an invested officer of ‘The Order of Canada’ "for her contributions as an architect, designing structures that enrich the public realm". Not only was she awarded many honors over the years, but she was also a part of the jury for the Aga Khan Award for Architecture in 2007. Today, Shim continues to serve as a member of the Aga Khan Architecture Award Steering Committee.

 2010: Royal Architectural Institute of Canada’s Governor General Medal for Architecture (The Corkin Gallery, Toronto, Ontario)
 2010: Royal Architectural Institute of Canada’s Governor General Medal for Architecture (Craven Road Studio, Toronto, Ontario)
 2010: Royal Architectural Institute of Canada’s Governor General Medal for Architecture (Ravine Guest House, Toronto, Ontario)
 2009: Architectural Woodwork Award - first place (The Integral House, Toronto, Ontario)
 2006: Wood Design Award - Award of Honour (Craven Road Studio, Toronto, Ontario)
 2005: Award of Merit. 31st Annual Heritage Toronto Awards. Architectural Conservation and Craftsmanship Category (Corkin Gallery, Pure Spirits, Building No. 61 in the Distillery District)
 2004: Royal Architectural Institute of Canada’s Governor General Medal for Architecture (Muskoka Boathouse, Lake Muskoka, Ontario)
 2004: Royal Architectural Institute of Canada’s Governor General Medal for Architecture (Weathering Steel House, Toronto, Ontario)
 2004: Chicago Anthenaeum and Museum of Architecture and Design Good Design Award (HAB Collection designed by Shim-Sutcliffe Architects and manufactured by Nienkamper)
 2004: Green Roof Award of Excellence (The Island House, Thousand Islands, Ontario)
 2004: Named Designers of the Year by the Interior Design Show, National Trade Centre, Exhibition Place, Toronto 
 2002: Royal Architectural Institute of Canada’s Governor General Medal for Architecture (Moorelands Camp Dining Hall, Lake Kawagama, Ontario)
 2002: Toronto Arts Award for Architecture and Design
 2002: Salute to the City Award honouring Excellence in Design and Contribution to the City of Toronto
 2002: AR+D Design Award, The Architectural Review. Highly Commended award (Moorelands Camp Dining Hall, Lake Kawagama, Ontario)
 2002: Architectural Record Houses Award (Island House, Thousand Islands, Ontario)
 2002: Architectural Record Houses Award (Tower House, Stratford, Ontario) 
 2001: Wood Design Award (first North American Wood Award program) - Award of Honour (Muskoka Boathouse, Lake Muskoka, Ontario)
 2001: Wood Design Award (first North American Wood Award program) - Award of Merit (Moorelands Camp Dining Hall / Kitchen, Lake Kawagama, Ontario)
 2001: ID Magazine - Design Award (Moorelands Camp Dining Hall, Lake Kawagama, Ontario)
 1999: Royal Architectural Institute of Canada’s Governor General Medal for Architecture (Ledbury Park, Toronto)
 1999: Architectural Record Houses Award (Craven Road House, Toronto)
 1999: Progressive Architecture Citation (Muskoka Boathouse, Lake Muskoka, Ontario)
 1998: American Wood Council, Wood Design Award Program Honour Award (Craven Road House, Toronto)
 1998: Canadian Wood Council, Wood Design Award Programme - Residential Category Award of Honour (Craven Road House, Toronto)
 1998: ID Magazine - Design Award - Best of Category - Environments (Ledbury Park, Toronto)
 1998: Virtu 11, Canadian Residential Furniture Competition, Award of Merit (Faucet)
 1997: Royal Architectural Institute of Canada’s Governor General Award for Architecture for the (Craven Road House, Toronto)
 1996: Canadian Architect Award of Excellence (Ledbury Park, Toronto)
 1996: Canadian Wood Council, Wood Design Award Programme - Residential Category - Award of Honour (Laneway House, Toronto)
 1996: Architectural Record - Interiors Award - (Bathroom Addition, Don Mills)
 1995: American Institute of Architects (AIA) Brick in Architecture Award (Pavilion Addition and Urban Garden, Toronto)
 1994: Royal Architectural Institute of Canada’s Governor General Award for Architecture (House on Horse Lake, Haliburton, Ontario)
 1994: Canadian Wood Council, Wood Design Award Programme - Residential Category - Award of Honour (House on Horse Lake, Haliburton, Ontario)
 1994: Royal Architectural Institute of Canada’s Governor General Medal for Architecture (Laneway House, Toronto)
 1992: Royal Architectural Institute of Canada’s Governor General Award for Architecture (Garden Pavilion and Reflecting Pool, Don Mills)
 1991: Virtu 6, Canadian Residential Furniture Competition, Winning Entry (Dining Table)
 1990: Virtu 5, Canadian Residential Furniture Competition, Winning Entry for (Sun Table)
 1987: Virtu 3, Canadian Residential Furniture Competition, Winning Entry (Step Light)
 1986: Virtu 2, Canadian Residential Furniture Competition, Winning Entry (Mail Box)
 1985: Virtu 1, Canadian Residential Furniture Competition, Winning Entry (Club Chair)

Further reading 
 G. Dault, "Remaking a Park with Style: Best Known for Tiny, Brilliantly Designed Houses, Brigitte Shim and Howard Sutcliffe Have Just Won Another Governor-General's Medal for Architecture for Their Ledbury Park Makeover.” The Glove and Mail, 12 June 1999, p. C20.
 “Perking up a Postwar Park: Summer and Winter, Waterfalls and Canals Interweave Ledbury Park in North York, Ontario in Its Dramatic Renovation by Architects Brigitte Shim and Howard Sutcliffe.” The Globe and Mail, 6 Dec 1997, p. C22.
 R. Barreneche, "Metal as Warm as Brandy." New York Times, 16 May 2002, p. F1.
 R. Barreneche, “Water Reflects and Illuminates Shim-Sutcliffe Architects' Weathering Steel House.” Architectural Record, vol. 192, no. 7, 2004, pp. 178–182.
 “Residence for the Sisters of St. Joseph of Toronto.” The Canadian Architect, vol. 59, no. 5, 2014, pp. 46–47.

References 

20th-century Canadian architects
Canadian women architects
1958 births
Living people
Academic staff of the University of Toronto
Jamaican emigrants to Canada
21st-century Canadian architects
People from Kingston, Jamaica
University of Waterloo alumni
Governor General's Award winners
20th-century Canadian women